Infinity Pool is a 2023 science fiction horror film written and directed by Brandon Cronenberg, starring Alexander Skarsgård, Mia Goth and Cleopatra Coleman. The film follows a struggling writer and his wife on vacation who, after an accident, discover the country's dark culture. 

Cronenberg started developing the project in 2019, with production later being pushed back to 2021. Much of the cast joined the project that year and filming took place primarily in Šibenik, Croatia.

Infinity Pool premiered at the 2023 Sundance Film Festival on January 22, 2023, and was theatrically released in Canada on January 27, 2023, by Elevation Pictures. The film received largely positive reviews from critics, with praise for the atmosphere and Cronenberg's direction but also criticism of its plot and storyline.

Plot 
Novelist James Foster and his wife Em spend time at a resort in the fictional seaside country of Li Tolqa, where a local festival is underway. The couple's chronic marital strife is exacerbated when Gabi, a fan of the only novel James has published to date, invites them to spend time with her and her husband Alban. The four have dinner and decide to spend the next day driving in the countryside, even though they have been warned that tourists are to remain on the resort compound at all times.

At a beach, as James urinates behind a tree, Gabi unexpectedly grabs him from behind and proceeds to give him a handjob. After a long day of sunbathing and cooking, the tourists embark on a  drunken drive back to their hotel. En route, James accidentally runs over a local man, killing him. Gabi insists that they cannot call the police, as the country is corrupt and they will not be safe.

The next day, James is arrested and is told that the penalty for his crime is death at the hand of the dead man's firstborn son. However, the country has a unique system of justice whereby the guilty, for a hefty fee, can be cloned and have their duplicates killed in their place. James, who married into money, pays the fee to have a double killed before his eyes. Em is horrified by the entire affair and wants to leave immediately, but James is titillated by the spectacle and wants to stay. He hides his passport, claiming that he has lost it, and encourages Em to return to the United States.

James extends his stay by a week and encounters Gabi and Alban again. They introduce him to a small group of Western tourists who all have been convicted of serious crimes and have paid to watch their doubles killed. These people return to the resort annually, commit heinous crimes, and pay to watch their doubles get slaughtered. Over the next several days, they encourage James to transform into a libertine criminal, encouraging him to kill locals, engage in intoxicated orgies, and abuse the resort staff.

James is rattled one night when he is tricked into brutalizing a clone of himself he had been led to believe was the police detective who initially arrested him. In a moment of clarity and panic, James retrieves his hidden passport and attempts to flee, but the tourist group accosts him and abducts him from the bus transporting him to the airport. Gabi reveals that she finds him pathetic and that the group is abusing him for their own amusement, hoping to turn him into a fellow murder tourist. He runs off into a nearby wilderness. Gabi shoots him in the leg as he flees.

After hours of wandering, James collapses at a farm, where a local family takes him in to recuperate. In his drugged state, he experiences a series of hallucinations. Once he has regained his strength, he is again confronted by Gabi's group, who order him to kill a duplicate of himself to complete his transformation. He initially refuses, but when the clone attempts to kill him, James beats him to death. As a reward, Gabi exposes her bare breast to James, inviting him to breastfeed.

The next day, as they head back to the United States, the other tourists casually chat about upcoming errands, while James is visibly shaken from the events of the past few days. Waiting in the airport for his flight, he resolves to remain behind instead. He returns to the closed resort, where he sits alone amidst the downpour of the monsoon.

Cast

Production

Development 
Brandon Cronenberg wrote the original screenplay for Infinity Pool with the intention of directing the film. He developed the story from actual experiences he had on unsatisfying vacations and a science fiction story about killing clones he had been writing. By May 2019, an international co-production had been set up between Canada, Hungary, and France. Filming was slated to begin at the end of 2019. By November 2020, filming locations in Croatia and Hungary were selected, but production was pushed back to 2021. In June 2021, it was announced that distribution would be handled by Elevation Pictures in Canada and Neon in the United States.

Casting 
In June 2021, Alexander Skarsgård was revealed to be starring in the lead role. By the time filming had started, additional casting announcements included Mia Goth, Thomas Kretschmann, Amanda Brugel, Caroline Boulton, John Ralston, Jeff Ricketts, Jalil Lespert and Roderick Hill.

Filming 
Principal photography took five weeks, beginning on September 6, 2021, at the Amadria Park resort in Šibenik, Croatia. After twelve days of shooting, production moved to Budapest, Hungary, where filming was completed. Post-production took place in Toronto, Canada, and was completed during the second half of 2022.

Release 
Infinity Pool premiered at the 2023 Sundance Film Festival and was released by Elevation Pictures in Canada on January 27, 2023. The film's European premiere will be held at the 73rd Berlin International Film Festival in the Berlinale Special section.

The film was released on VOD on February 14, 2023.

MPA rating 
For its United States release, an initial cut received an NC-17 rating from the Motion Picture Association (MPA). Neon appealed to the Classification and Rating Administration appeals board, but the rating was upheld. After re-edits, it achieved an R rating.

Reception

Box office 
Infinity Pool grossed $1.1 million from 1,835 theaters on its first day of release. It went on to debut to $2.7 million, finishing eighth at the box office and out-grossing the lifetime domestic run of the director's father's 2022 release, Crimes of the Future ($2.4 million). It dropped out of the box office top ten in its second weekend with $900,000.

Critical response
On the review aggregator website Rotten Tomatoes, the film holds an approval rating of 87% based on 175 reviews, with an average rating of 7.1/10. The site's critical consensus reads, "Turbulent waters even for strong swimmers, Infinity Pool provides a visceral all-inclusive retreat of Cronenbergian perversion for those wanting to escape commercial sundries." On Metacritic, the film has a weighted average score of 72 out of 100 based on 39 critics, indicating "generally favorable reviews". Audiences polled by CinemaScore gave the film an average grade of "C–" on an A+ to F scale, while those polled by PostTrak gave it a 52% positive score, with 28% saying they would definitely recommend it.

Reviewing Infinity Pool following its premiere at Sundance, David Fear of Rolling Stone described the film as being laced with "a rage, an edge and a warped satirical sensibility that feels unique, and uniquely unnerving enough to kill talk of family coattails", praising Cronenberg's screenplay and direction, as well the lead performances. The film is a New York Times Critic's Pick, with Jeannette Catsoulis writing, "Surreal, sophisticated, and sometimes sickening, Infinity Pool suggests that while the elder Cronenberg might be fixated on the disintegration of our bodies, his son is more concerned with the destruction of our souls." Esther Zuckerman of Vanity Fair commended the cast performances (particularly Goth's), but was overall mixed on the film, asserting that it is "provocative with questionable payoff". 

Comparing the film to Possessor in a positive Los Angeles Times review, Katie Walsh wrote that Infinity Pool "is larger in scope than its predecessor, the narrative grander, sharper, funnier and more wickedly perverse." Meagan Navarro of Bloody Disgusting also gave the film a positive review, writing, "Cronenberg’s sense of style, paired with an unrelenting sense of dread and tension and two utterly captivating, depraved leads ensure these provocative waters are well worth wading into." 

In a negative review, Michael O'Sullivan from The Washington Post claimed that the movie has an "eye-roll-inducing plot" and that Cronenberg has inherited some of his father's worst excesses: sophomoric, fetishistic violence and gratuitous sexualization. In another negative review from The Hollywood Reporter, David Rooney claimed that the movie lacks substance and has a silly storyline. IndieWire described the film as shallow, cold and clammy.  Mae Abdulbaki of Screen Rant gave the film a two out of five, feeling the story is messy and lacks cohesion. Reuben Baron of Looper noted that the film's attempt at cultural commentary is shallow and that the film gives little reason for viewers to care about its "loathsome characters", although Baron did praise Goth's performance.

References

External links 
 
 

2023 horror films
2023 films
2023 science fiction films
2020s Canadian films
2020s English-language films
2023 horror thriller films
2020s science fiction horror films
2020s science fiction thriller films
Canadian horror thriller films
Canadian science fiction horror films
Canadian science fiction thriller films
Croatian science fiction horror films
Croatian thriller films
English-language Canadian films
English-language Croatian films
English-language Hungarian films
Film controversies in the United States
Films about cloning
Films about vacationing
Films directed by Brandon Cronenberg
Films set on fictional islands
Films shot in Croatia
Films shot in Hungary
Hungarian horror films
Hungarian science fiction thriller films
Rating controversies in film